Nicholas Statham (fl. 1467) was an English lawyer, known as a legal writer.

Life
He is stated to have been born at Morley, Derbyshire. He was reader of Lincoln's Inn in Lent term 1471. On 30 October 1467 he received a patent for the reversion as second baron of the exchequer on the death of John Clerke. Clerke was certainly alive in 1471, but there is no mention of either him or Statham between that date and 3 February 1481, when Thomas Whittington was made second baron. Consequently it is not known whether Statham ever obtained the office.

Work
Statham's name is never mentioned in the year-books, but he is credited with an abridgment of the cases reported in them in the reign of Henry VI, which is the earliest work of the kind now extant. Statham's abridgment was printed by R. Pynson as Epitome Annalium Librorum tempore Henrici Sexti, London [1495 ?]; other editions appeared in 1585 and 1679.

References

External links
Statham, Nicholas. 1490. Abridgement of cases to the end of Henry VI. (Rouen) : Per me. R. Pynson. Harvard University Library Page Delivery Service.

People from the Borough of Erewash
English lawyers
English legal writers
Year of death unknown
Year of birth unknown